Jakob "Köbi" Kuhn (12 October 1943 – 26 November 2019) was a Swiss football player and manager.

During his playing career he played primarily for FC Zürich and won 63 caps for Switzerland, one of which was at the 1966 FIFA World Cup in England. As a manager, he led his national team to Euro 2004 and 2008 and the 2006 World Cup.

Playing career
Kuhn has been described as a clever and skilful midfielder. He spent 16 years with FC Zürich, captaining them to the Swiss Super League six times, as well as the Swiss Cup five times. He also played for Zürich in European Cup semi-finals in 1963 and 1977. He left FCZ for city rivals Grasshopper Club Zürich for a short period towards the end of his career. Internationally he won 63 caps, and as a 22-year-old played one game at the 1966 World Cup, before being sent home in disgrace, and later banned for 12 months from the national team, for breaking a curfew.

Managerial career
After retiring as a player, Kuhn returned to FC Zürich in 1979 to take charge of their youth set-up. He was later caretaker manager of the club for two short spells between May 1983 and July 1984, as the club searched for a permanent successor to Daniel Jeandupeux. In 1995, he left the club and took a youth-coaching position at the Swiss FA. He led the national under-18 side to an impressive showing at the 1997 European Championships, and later guided the U21s towards qualification for the finals of their respective European Championships for the first time.

Kuhn was promoted to coach of the senior national team in June 2001, replacing the Argentine Enzo Trossero. Kuhn had been approached to become Trossero's assistant, but turned down the offer. With no real senior coaching experience, his appointment as head coach was first not universally applauded, but he has led the Swiss to Euro 2004 and the second round of the 2006 World Cup. Since Kuhn took part in the 1966 World Cup as a player, Switzerland had qualified for just one World Cup, in 1994, and one Euro finals, in 1996. Kuhn spent seven years as coach of the national team, and utilised many of the youth players he had worked with at youth level, ultimately helped building a successful football generation that would be later inherited by Ottmar Hitzfeld. He is second in all-time matches coached for the Swiss team, behind Karl Rappan.

Euro 2004 and World Cup 2006
After out-qualifying Russia and the Republic of Ireland to reach Euro 2004, the Swiss team drew 0–0 with Croatia in their opening game of the finals, before defeats to England and France saw them finish bottom of their group. In the game against holders France, Johan Vonlanthen scored Switzerland's equalising goal before Thierry Henry's two late goals. Vonlanthen's goal was not only his team's only goal of the tournament, but also made him the tournament's youngest ever scorer.

On their way to the 2006 World Cup in Germany, the Swiss team were undefeated in qualification Group 4. A bad-tempered play-off against Turkey followed, which saw the Swiss progress on away goals. At the World Cup finals, the Swiss defence again shone, as they topped their group which included France, Togo and South Korea. In the second round, the team were eliminated on penalties after a 0–0 draw with Ukraine. The team suffered the rare feat of getting knocked out without conceding a goal.

Euro 2008
Kuhn announced in October 2006 that he would terminate his engagement as manager of the Swiss squad after Euro 2008. In the week leading up to the tournament, Kuhn's preparations were disrupted by an epileptic attack hospitalising his wife.

In the opening game the Czech Republic eventually managed to break down the Swiss co-hosts' resistance to win 1–0. During the game, Switzerland hit the bar and had captain Alexander Frei limp out of the tournament. In their second match, against Turkey, Switzerland wasted several good chances in a torrential downpour before succumbing to a late, deflected winner, making the score 2–1. Prior to the game, Kuhn had been told that his wife had been woken from her nine-day induced coma. Kuhn told the Tages-Anzeiger newspaper, "I had two feelings inside me on Wednesday, one of huge disappointment because we had gone out of the tournament and a great joy because of the surprise news from the hospital."

Already-qualified Portugal provided the opposition for Kuhn's final match, which saw Portugal make eight changes to their team. Switzerland won 2–0 with both goals from Hakan Yakin. After the game, the Switzerland players unfurled a banner reading Merci Köbi (Thanks Köbi) as a mark of gratitude for his work. Kuhn had stated earlier that it was the aim of the Switzerland squad to win the tournament at home. He was succeeded by Ottmar Hitzfeld the Bayern Munich head coach.

Managerial statistics
Source:

References

1943 births
2019 deaths
Footballers from Zürich
Association football midfielders
Swiss men's footballers
Swiss football managers
Switzerland international footballers
Switzerland national football team managers
1966 FIFA World Cup players
UEFA Euro 2004 managers
2006 FIFA World Cup managers
UEFA Euro 2008 managers
Grasshopper Club Zürich players
FC Zürich players
FC Zürich managers
Swiss-German people